Alcohol abuse encompasses a spectrum of unhealthy alcohol drinking behaviors, ranging from binge drinking to alcohol dependence, in extreme cases resulting in health problems for individuals and large scale social problems such as alcohol-related crimes.

Alcohol abuse was a psychiatric diagnosis in the DSM-IV, and has been merged with alcohol dependence into alcohol use disorder in the DSM-5.

Globally, excessive alcohol consumption is the seventh leading risk factor for both death and the burden of disease and injury, representing 5.1% of the total global burden of disease and injury, measured in disability-adjusted life years (DALYs). In short, except for tobacco, alcohol accounts for a higher burden of disease than any other drug. Alcohol use is a major cause of preventable liver disease worldwide, and alcoholic liver disease is the main alcohol-related chronic medical illness. Millions of people of all ages, from adolescents to the elderly, engage in unhealthy drinking. Alcohol use disorder can affect people from all walks of life. There are many factors that play a role in causing someone to have an alcohol use disorder: genetics, psychiatric conditions, trauma, environmental issues, and even parental drinking habits.

Definitions 

Risky drinking (also called hazardous drinking) is defined by drinking above the recommended limits:
 greater than 14 standard drinks units per week or greater than 4 standard drinks on a single occasion in men
 greater than 7 standard drinks units per week or greater than 3 standard drinks on a single occasion in women
 any drinking in pregnant women or persons < 21 years old

Binge drinking is a pattern of alcohol consumption that brings blood alcohol concentration ≥ 0.08%, usually corresponding to
 ≥ 5 standard drinks on a single occasion in men
 ≥ 4 standard drinks on a single occasion in women

In the DSM-IV, alcohol abuse and alcohol dependence were defined as distinct disorders from 1994 to 2013. The DSM-5 combined those two disorders into alcohol use disorder with sub-classifications of severity. The DSM-IV definition is no longer used. There is no "alcoholism" diagnosis in medical care.

Alcohol misuse is a term used by United States Preventive Services Task Force to describe a spectrum of drinking behaviors that encompass risky drinking, alcohol abuse, and alcohol dependence (similar meaning to alcohol use disorder but not a term used in DSM).

Signs and symptoms 

Individuals with an alcohol use disorder will often complain of difficulty with interpersonal relationships, problems at work or school, and legal problems. Additionally, people may complain of irritability and insomnia. Alcohol abuse is also an important cause of chronic fatigue.
Signs of alcohol abuse are related to alcohol's effects on organ systems. However, while these findings are often present, they are not necessary to make a diagnosis of alcohol abuse. Signs of alcohol abuse show its drastic effects on the central nervous system, including inebriation and poor judgment; chronic anxiety, irritability, and insomnia. Alcohol's effects on the liver include elevated liver function tests (classically AST is at least twice as high as ALT). Prolonged use leads to cirrhosis and liver failure. With cirrhosis, patients develop an inability to process hormones and toxins. The skin of a patient with alcoholic cirrhosis can feature spider angiomas, palmar erythema and — in acute liver failure — jaundice and ascites. The derangements of the endocrine system lead to the enlargement of the male breasts. The inability to process toxins leads to liver disease, such as hepatic encephalopathy.

Alcohol abuse can result in brain damage which causes impairments in executive functioning such as impairments to working memory and visuospatial function, and can cause an abnormal personality as well as affective disorders to develop. Binge drinking is associated with individuals reporting fair to poor health compared to non-binge drinking individuals and which may progressively worsen over time. Alcohol also causes impairment in a person's critical thinking. A person's ability to reason in stressful situations is compromised, and they seem very inattentive to what is going on around them. Alcoholism can cause significant impairment in social skills, due to the neurotoxic effects of alcohol on the brain, especially the prefrontal cortex area of the brain. The prefrontal cortex is responsible for cognitive functions such as working memory, impulse control and decision making.  This region of the brain is vulnerable to chronic alcohol-induced oxidative DNA damage.  The social skills that can be impaired by alcohol abuse include impairments in perceiving facial emotions, difficulty with perceiving vocal emotions and theory of mind deficits; the ability to understand humour can also impaired. Adolescent binge drinkers are most sensitive to damaging neurocognitive functions especially executive functions and memory. People who abuse alcohol are less likely to survive critical illness with a higher risk for having sepsis and were more likely to die during hospitalization.

A smaller volume of consumed alcohol has a greater impact on the older adult than it does on a younger individual. As a result, the American Geriatrics Society recommends for an older adult with no known risk factors less than one drink a day or fewer than two drinks per occasion regardless of gender.

Violence 
Alcohol abuse is significantly associated with suicide and violence. Alcohol is the most significant health concern in Native American communities because of very high rates of alcohol dependence and abuse; up to 80 percent of suicides and 60 percent of violent acts are a result of alcohol abuse in Native American communities.

In the United States alcohol-related violence is related to more severe injuries and chronic cases.

Pregnancy 

Alcohol abuse among pregnant women causes their baby to develop fetal alcohol syndrome. Fetal alcohol syndrome is the pattern of physical abnormalities and the impairment of mental development which is seen with increasing frequency among children with alcoholic mothers. Alcohol exposure in a developing fetus can result in slowed development of the fetal brain, resulting in severe retardation or death. Surviving infants may have severe abnormalities such as abnormal eyes, fissures, lips and incomplete cerebella. Some infants may develop lung disease. It is even possible that the baby throughout pregnancy will develop heart defects such as ventricular septal defect or atrial septal defect. Experts suggest that pregnant women take no more than one unit of alcohol per day. However, other organizations advise complete abstinence from alcohol while pregnant.

Adolescence 
Adolescence and the onset of puberty have both a physiological and social impact on a developing person. One of these social impacts is the increase in risk-taking behaviors, such as the emergence of alcohol use. About half of grade 12 students have been drunk, and a third binge drink. About 3% drink every day. Children aged 16 and under who consume alcohol heavily display symptoms of conduct disorder. Its symptoms include troublesome behaviour in school, constantly lying, learning disabilities and social impairments.

Alcohol abuse during adolescence greatly increases the risk of developing an alcohol use disorder in adulthood due to changes to neurocircuitry that alcohol abuse causes in the vulnerable adolescent brain. Younger ages of initial consumption among males in recent studies has shown to be associated with increased rates of alcohol abuse within the general population.

Societal inequalities (among other factors) have influenced an adolescents decision to consume alcohol. One study suggests that girls were scrutinized for "drinking like men", whereas magazines that target the male population sent underlying messages to boys and or men that drinking alcohol was "masculine". (Bogren, 2010)

Causes 
The cause of alcohol abuse is complex. Alcohol abuse is related to economic and biological origins and is associated with adverse health consequences. Peer pressure influences individuals to abuse alcohol; however, most of the influence of peers is due to inaccurate perceptions of the risks of alcohol abuse. According to Gelder, Mayou and Geddes (2005)  easy accessibility of alcohol is one of the reasons people engage in alcohol abuse as this substance is easily obtained in shops. Another influencing factor among adolescents and college students are the perceptions of social norms for drinking; people will often drink more to keep up with their peers, as they believe their peers drink more than they actually do. They might also expect to drink more given the context (e.g. sporting event, house party, etc.). This perception of norms results in higher alcohol consumption than is normal.
Alcohol abuse is also associated with acculturation, because social and cultural factors such as an ethnic group's norms and attitudes can influence alcohol abuse.

Mental illness 
A person misusing alcohol may be doing so because they find alcohol's effects provide relief from a psychological problem, such as anxiety or depression. Often both the alcohol misuse and psychological problems need to be treated at the same time.

The numbing effects of alcohol and narcotics can become a coping strategy for traumatized people who are unable to dissociate themselves from the trauma. However, the altered or intoxicated state of the abuser prevents the full consciousness necessary for healing.

Puberty 
Gender differences may affect drinking patterns and the risk for developing alcohol use disorders. Sensation-seeking behaviors have been previously shown to be associated with advanced pubertal maturation, as well as the company of deviant peers. Early pubertal maturation, as indicated by advanced morphological and hormonal development, has been linked to increased alcohol usage in both male and female individuals. Additionally, when controlling for age, this association between advanced development and alcohol use still held true.

Mechanisms 
Excessive alcohol use causes neuroinflammation and leads to myelin disruptions and white matter loss. The developing adolescent brain is at increased risk of brain damage and other long-lasting alterations to the brain. Adolescents with an alcohol use disorder damage the hippocampal, prefrontal cortex, and temporal lobes.  Chronic alcohol exposure can result in increased DNA damage in the brain, as well as reduced  DNA repair and increased neuronal cell death.  Alcohol metabolism generates genotoxic acetaldehyde and reactive oxygen species.

Until recently, the underlying mechanisms mediating the link between pubertal maturation and increased alcohol use in adolescence was poorly understood. Now research has suggested that sex steroid hormone levels may play a role in this interaction. When controlling for age, it was demonstrated that elevated estradiol and testosterone levels in male teenagers undergoing pubertal development was linked to increased alcohol consumption. It has been suggested that sex hormones promote alcohol consumption behaviors in teens by stimulating areas in the male adolescent brain associated with reward processing. The same associations with hormone levels were not demonstrated in females undergoing pubertal development. It is hypothesized that sex steroid hormones, such as testosterone and estradiol, are stimulating areas in the male brain that function to promote sensation-seeking and status-seeking behaviors and result in increased alcohol usage.

Additionally, the enzyme TTTan aromatase, which functions in the male brain to convert testosterone to estradiols, has been linked to addictive and reward-seeking behaviors. Therefore, the increased activity of the enzyme may be influencing male adolescent alcohol-usage behaviors during pubertal development. The underlying mechanisms for female alcohol consumption and abuse is still under examination, but is believed to be largely influenced by morphological, rather than hormonal, changes during puberty as well as the presence of deviant peer groups.

The brain goes through dynamic changes during adolescence as a result of advancing pubertal maturation, and alcohol can damage long- and short-term growth processes in teenagers. The rapid effect of drugs releases the neurotransmitter dopamine which acts as reinforcement for the behavior.

Alcohol is the most recreationally used drug internationally, throughout history it has played a variety of roles, from medicine to a mood enhancer. Alcoholism and alcohol abuse however have undergone rigorous examination as a disease which has pervasive physiological and biosocial implications. The genesis and maintenance of the disease involves the mind, body, society and culture. A common anthropological approach to understanding alcoholism is one which relates to a social factor, and this is cross-cultural studies. The description and analysis of the degree of possibilities in drinking and its results among various populations indeed constitutes one of anthropology's major contributions to the field of alcohol studies. Understanding interactions between factors and evaluating ideas regarding how alcohol usage correlates to other cultural elements requires a number of cross-cultural comparisons. Anthropologists have analyzed a large global sample of cultures examining the association between particular traits for each which relate to the cultural components of alcoholism, these include significant measures which emphasize the social system, reliance and anxiety and strength as physical and social measures. These are the primary drivers of consuming alcohol affecting individuals on a psychosocial level.

Individualistic cultures such as the United States or Australia are amongst some of the highest consumers of alcohol in the whole world, however this rate of consumption does not necessarily coincide with the rate of abuse as countries like Russia which are highly collectivist see the highest rates of Alcoholism. Research suggests that people who score highly on individualism, a trait commonly fostered by the culture, report a lower rate of alcohol abuse and alcohol related disorders so much so that the association was negative, however a higher average consumption of alcohol per week. It is implied that individuals will drink more in a given setting, or on average because they are less receptive towards negative social attitudes surrounding excessive consumption. This however acts on another component, by where individualism protects from maladaptive consumption by lowering the need to drink socially. The final axis by which individualism protects from abusive consumption is that it promotes higher degrees of individualization and achievement values which promote personally suited rewards, this allow the individual to be more cognizant of potential alcohol abuse, and therefore protect from damaging mentalities in those who already identify as drinkers.

Alcohol abuse also has a variety of biosocial implications, such as the physiologically effects of a detox, how the detox period interacts with ones social life and how these interactions can make beating alcoholism a complex, difficult process. Alcohol abuse can lead to a number of physical issues and may even create a mental health condition, leading to a double classification for the alcoholic. The stress, the social perceptions of these issues may reinforce abusive drinking habits. Alcoholism is the most severe form of alcohol dependence and abuse, it is often in fact a complicated hereditary disease. While it can run it families this is only a correlation and does not prove that the inherited factors play a role. Genetic influences on its genesis are suggested by numerous different sources of evidence. Alcoholism among adopted people has a stronger correlation with their biological parents than with their adopted parents, according to adoption research. Alcohol especially has a large effect on young and developing brains and chances of further abuse, the culture surrounding the acceptable age of drinking therefore can be a biosocial factor. This however isn't always preventable, alcohol when consumed during pregnancy is profoundly damaging. The umbilical cord allows the mother's blood alcohol to reach the infant. Consumption of alcohol during pregnancy can result in miscarriage, and a number of physical and cognitive that can last a lifetime to the child. Therefore the biological implications of alcohol abuse are also further reaching than just the physical issues experienced by the consumer.

Diagnosis

DSM-IV 
Alcohol abuse was defined in the DSM-IV as a maladaptive pattern of drinking. For its diagnosis, at least one of the following criteria had to be fulfilled in the last 12 months:
 Recurrent use of alcohol resulting in a failure to fulfill major role obligations at work, school, or home
 Recurrent alcohol use in situations in which it is physically hazardous
 Recurrent alcohol-related legal problems
 Continued alcohol use despite having persistent or recurrent social or interpersonal problems caused or exacerbated by the effects of alcohol

DSM-5 
The alcohol abuse diagnosis is no longer used in the DSM-5 (released in 2013), it is now part of the alcohol use disorder diagnosis. Of the four alcohol abuse criteria, all except the one referring to alcohol-related legal problems are included in the alcohol use disorder criteria.

Screening 

The Alcohol Use Disorders Identification Test (AUDIT) is considered the most accurate alcohol screening tool for identifying potential alcohol misuse, including dependence. It was developed by the World Health Organisation, designed initially for use in primary healthcare settings with supporting guidance.

Prevention 

Preventing or reducing the harm has been called for via increased taxation of alcohol, stricter regulation of alcohol advertising, and the provision of brief Interventions. Brief Interventions for alcohol abuse reduce the incidence of unsafe sex, sexual violence, unplanned pregnancy, and, likely, STD transmission. Information and education on social norms and the harms associated with alcohol abuse delivered via the internet or face-to-face has not been found to result in any meaningful benefit in changing harmful drinking behaviours in young people.

According to European law, individuals who are suffering from alcohol abuse or other related problems cannot be given a driver's license, or if in possession of a license cannot get it renewed. This is a way to prevent individuals driving under the influence of alcohol, but does not prevent alcohol abuse per se.

An individual's need for alcohol can depend on their family's alcohol use history. For instance, if it is discovered that their family history with alcohol has a strong pattern, there might be a need for education to be set in place to reduce the likelihood of reoccurrence (Powers, 2007). However, studies have established that those with alcohol abuse tend to have family members who try to provide help. On many of these occasions, the family members would try to help the individual to change or to help improve the individual's lifestyle.

Treatment 
Youth treatment and intervention should focus on eliminating or reducing the effects of adverse childhood experiences, like childhood maltreatment, since these are common risk factors contributing to the early development of alcohol abuse.  Approaches like contingency management and motivational interviewing have shown to be effective means of treating substance abuse in impulsive adolescents by focusing on positive rewards and redirecting them towards healthier goals. Educating youth about what is considered heavy drinking along with helping them focus on their own drinking behaviors has been shown to effectively change their perceptions of drinking and could potentially help them to avoid alcohol abuse.
Completely stopping the use of alcohol, or "abstinence", is the ideal goal of treatment. The motivation required to achieve abstinence is dynamic; family, friends and health practitioners play a role in affecting this motivation.

Some people who abuse alcohol may be able to reduce the amount they drink, also called "drinking in moderation". If this method does not work, the person may need to try abstinence. Abstinence has been regularly achieved by many alcoholics in Alcoholics Anonymous.

Mindfulness-based intervention programs (that encourage people to be aware of their own experiences in the present moment and of emotions that arise from thoughts) can reduce the consumption of alcohol.

A major barrier to seeking treatment for those struggling with alcohol abuse is the stigma associated with alcohol abuse itself.  Those who struggle with alcohol abuse are less likely to utilize substance (or alcohol) abuse treatment services when they perceived higher stigma with alcohol abuse.  The stigmatization of individuals who abuse alcohol has been linked to increased levels of depression, increased levels of anxiety, decreased levels of self-esteem, and poor sleeping habits. While negative thoughts and views around the subject of alcohol abuse can keep those struggling with this issue from seeking the treatment they need, there have been several things that have been found to reduce this stigma. Social support can be an effective tool for counteracting the harmful effects of stigma and shame on those struggling with alcohol abuse. Social support can help push those struggling with alcohol abuse to overcome the negative connotation associated with their struggle and finally seek the treatment that they need.

Prognosis 
Alcohol abuse during adolescence, especially early adolescence (i.e. before age 15), may lead to long-term changes in the brain which leaves them at increased risk of alcoholism in later years; genetic factors also influence age of onset of alcohol abuse and risk of alcoholism. For example, about 40 percent of those who begin drinking alcohol before age 15 develop alcohol dependence in later life, whereas only 10 percent of those who did not begin drinking until 20 years or older developed an alcohol problem in later life. It is not entirely clear whether this association is causal, and some researchers have been known to disagree with this view.

Alcohol use disorders often cause a wide range of cognitive impairments that result in significant impairment of the affected individual. If alcohol-induced neurotoxicity has occurred a period of abstinence for on average a year is required for the cognitive deficits of alcohol abuse to reverse.

College/university students who are heavy binge drinkers (three or more times in the past two weeks) are 19 times more likely to be diagnosed with alcohol dependence, and 13 times more likely to be diagnosed with alcohol abuse compared to non-heavy episodic drinkers, though the direction of causality remains unclear. Occasional binge drinkers (one or two times in the past two weeks), were found to be four times more likely to be diagnosed with alcohol abuse or dependence compared to non-heavy episodic drinkers.

Epidemiology 
Alcohol abuse is said to be most common in people aged between 15 and 24 years, according to Moreira 2009. However, this particular study of 7275 college students in England collected no comparative data from other age groups or countries.

Causes of alcohol abuse are complex and are likely the combination of many factors, from coping with stress to childhood development. The US Department of Health & Human Services identifies several factors influencing adolescent alcohol use, such as risk-taking, expectancies, sensitivity and tolerance, personality and psychiatric comorbidity, hereditary factors, and environmental aspects.

Studies show that child maltreatment such as neglect, physical, and/or sexual abuse, as well as having parents with alcohol abuse problems, increases the likelihood of that child developing alcohol use disorders later in life. According to Shin, Edwards, Heeren, & Amodeo (2009), underage drinking is more prevalent among teens that experienced multiple types of childhood maltreatment regardless of parental alcohol abuse, putting them at a greater risk for alcohol use disorders. Genetic and environmental factors play a role in the development of alcohol use disorders, depending on age. The influence of genetic risk factors in developing alcohol use disorders increase with age ranging from 28% in adolescence and 58% in adults.

Societal and economic costs 

Alcohol abuse is associated with many accidents, fights, and offences, including criminal. Alcohol is responsible in the world for 1.8 million deaths and results in disability in approximately 58.3 million people. Approximately 40 percent of the 58.3 million people disabled through alcohol abuse are disabled due to alcohol-related neuropsychiatric disorders. Alcohol abuse is highly associated with adolescent suicide. Adolescents who abuse alcohol are 17 times more likely to commit suicide than adolescents who don't drink. Additionally, alcohol abuse increases the risk of individuals either experiencing or perpetrating sexual violence. Alcohol availability and consumption  rates and alcohol rates are positively associated with violent crimes, through specifics differ between particular countries and cultures.

By country 
According to studies of present and former alcoholic drinkers in Canada, 20% of them are aware that their drinking has negatively impacted their lives in various vital areas including finances, work and relationships.

Problems caused by alcohol abuse in Ireland cost about 3.7 billion euro in 2007.

In South Africa, where HIV infection is epidemic, alcohol abusers exposed themselves to double the risk of this infection.

The introduction of alcopops, sweet and pleasantly flavoured alcoholic drinks, was responsible for half of the increase in alcohol abuse in 15- and 16-year-olds, according to one survey in Sweden. In the case of girls, the alcopops, which disguise the taste of alcohol, were responsible for two thirds of the increase. The introduction of alcopops to Sweden was a result of Sweden joining the European Union and adopting the entire European Union law.

Alcohol misuse costs the United Kingdom's National Health Service £3 billion per year. The cost to employers is 6.4 billion pounds sterling per year. These figures do not include the crime and social problems associated with alcohol misuse. The number of women regularly drinking alcohol has almost caught up with men.

In the United States, many people are arrested for drinking and driving. Also, people under the influence of alcohol commit a large portion of various violent crimes, including child abuse, homicide and suicide. In addition, people of minority groups are affected by alcohol-related problems disproportionately, with the exception of Asian Americans. According to criminologist Hung‐En Sung "alcohol is the most widely abused psychoactive substance in the United States".

See also 
 0-0-1-3 – a United States Air Force program for alcohol abuse prevention
 Drunken monkey hypothesis

References

Further reading

External links 

 dassa.sa.gov.au
 Rethinking Drinking, National Institute on Alcohol Abuse and Alcoholism
 Alcohol and Crime: Data from 2002 to 2008 Bureau of Justice Statistics
 Healthy Youth! Alcohol & Drug Abuse – U.S. Centers for Disease Control (CDC)

 
Substance abuse